James Reid Pringle was the thirtieth intendant (mayor) of Charleston, South Carolina, serving one term from 1830 to 1831.

Pringle was born in 1782 to Robert Pringle and Mary Reid. Pringle represented St. Philip's and St. Michael's parishes (i.e., the Charleston area) in South Carolina General Assembly from 1808 to 1813. He then served three sessions in the South Carolina Senate from 1814 to 1819 and served as the president of the Senate starting in 1818. He resigned when he was appointed as United States Collector for the Port of Charleston in 1819.

He was elected intendant on September 6, 1830, in what was described as "one of the hottest elections ever contested in Charleston" in a race between the Unionists (Pringle) and Nullifiers (Henry L. Pinckney). Both candidates supported President Andrew Jackson, but the issue of nullification predominated the contest. The turnout for the election was thought to have been the highest ever for a municipal contest; Pringle secured 838 votes while Laurens got 754. He served a single term before being beaten by the same candidate, Henry L. Pinckney, in September 1831.

Pringle was nominated for another term as Collector of Customs for Charleston in January 1832 in anticipation of the end of his current term on January 29, 1832. He was nominated again for the same post in anticipation of the end of his current term on January 29, 1840.

He died on July 11, 1840, and is buried in St. Michael's Episcopal churchyard.

References

American people of Scottish descent
Mayors of Charleston, South Carolina
Members of the South Carolina House of Representatives
1782 births
1840 deaths
19th-century American politicians